Ortaköy District is a district of the Çorum Province of Turkey. Its seat is the town of Ortaköy. Its area is 300 km2, and its population is 6,425 (2021).

Composition
There are two municipalities in Ortaköy District:
 Aştavul
 Ortaköy

There are 14 villages in Ortaköy District:

 Asar
 Büyükkışla
 Cevizli
 Esentepe
 Fındıklı
 İncesu
 Karahacip
 Kavakalan
 Kızılhamza
 Oruçpınar
 Salbaş
 Senemoğlu
 Yaylacık
 Yukarıkuyucak

References

Districts of Çorum Province